"Celebrate" is a 2012 song by the singer CeCe Peniston, released as a digital single on 16 Bars Music Group on March 27, 2012.

Credits and personnel
 Cecilia Peniston - lead vocals
 Dmitry Korchmaryov  - producer, remix
 Robert Nicholas Vadney - producer, remix
 Bobby Drake  - producer, remix

Track listings and formats
 MD, EU & US, #()
 "Celebrate"  - 3:40

 MD, EU & US, #()
 "Celebrate (Dmitry KO Remix)" -  5:56
 "Celebrate (Robert Vadney Radio Remix)" -  3:52
 "Celebrate (Robert Vadney Remix)" -  5:21
 "Celebrate (Robert Vadney Dub Remix)" -  5:07
 "Celebrate (Zaire Remix)" -  4:46
 "Celebrate (Bobby Drake Remix)" -  5:43

References

General

 Specific

External links 
 

2012 singles
CeCe Peniston songs
2012 songs
Eurodance songs
Songs written by CeCe Peniston